An urban district or urban raion is the second-level administrative division in certain cities in Ukraine. An urban district is subordinate to the city administration.

Overview

There are 111 districts in 19 cities of Ukraine. The cities that contain district division in a city usually are of national (such as Kyiv and Sevastopol) or regional significance. The number of districts in city per region varies between the minimum of two and up to 21 in Donetsk Oblast (the maximum districts in a single city are in Kyiv).

The Article 133 of the Constitution of Ukraine states that districts in cities are element of the administrative-territorial division of state, while the Article 140 states that issues in organization of management of districts in cities belongs to the competence of city's councils.

The status of Kyiv city is defined by the Law of Ukraine "About capital of Ukraine - Hero-city Kyiv".

Before February 2016 many districts were named for people, places, events, and organizations associated with early years of the Soviet Union; but many were renamed since to comply with decommunization laws.

List of urban districts in Ukraine

Kyiv

Sevastopol

Cherkasy Oblast

Chernihiv Oblast

Chernivtsi Oblast

Crimea

Dnipropetrovsk Oblast

Donetsk Oblast

Kharkiv Oblast

Kherson Oblast

Kirovohrad Oblast

Luhansk Oblast

Lviv Oblast

Mykolaiv Oblast

Odesa Oblast

Poltava Oblast

Sumy Oblast

Zaporizhzhia Oblast

Zhytomyr Oblast

See also

 ISO 3166-2:UA
 List of places named after people (Ukraine)
 Populated places in Ukraine
 Urbanization

Notes

References

External links
 2001 Ukrainian census, Population Structure  
 Regions of Ukraine and its composition 

 
Subdivisions of Ukraine
Ukraine 2
Lists of subdivisions of Ukraine